Paraytec (Parallel Array Technology) is a scientific instrument company that designs and manufactures ultraviolet imaging detectors, (based on CMOS chips) used mainly in scientific research.

History

Paraytec was founded in 2005 as a spin-out from The University of York.

In July 2011 Paraytec entered into a development and technology licensing agreement with Malvern Instruments.

Recognition 

 R&D 100 Award (2007)
 UK Trade and Investment (UKTI) Export Award (2007)
 Pittcon Editors' Awards Silver (2007)

References 

Instrument-making corporations